IB3 may refer to:

 IB3 (TV channel), Spanish broadcaster
 Infinity Blade III, role-playing iOS game
 Ingrid Burley, American rapper formerly known as "IB3"